Meghai is a river located in Uttar Pradesh of India. Meghai flows through parts of the Ghazipur, Mau, Sultanpur, Akbarpur and Azamgarh Districts. It starts from Azamgarh District and its mouth opens at Tamsa river.

References

Rivers of Uttar Pradesh